Meridian International School, established in 2001, is an international day school in Kyiv, Ukraine, catering for children from pre-school to the 11th grade.

MIS is a member of Quality Schools International and the European Council of International Schools.

Description
The educational equipment and facilities include computing room, science laboratories, art workshops.  The school provides bus services for students from different districts of Kyiv.

Curriculum
The school follows the national curriculum of Ukraine. The school offers education in Ukrainian and English. The Ukrainian program is recognised by the Ministry of Education and Science of Ukraine.

The curriculum includes languages, mathematics, science, technology, humanities, social studies, physical education, computer skills, music and the creative arts. Sports and extracurricular activities such as clubs and trips are also offered.

Students
Meridian International School opened with 50 students from kindergarten to grade 11 and now enrolls about 450 students.

As of 2018, the student body consists of more than 36 nationalities. Classes are generally limited to 20 or fewer students.

Organizations

World Scholars Cup since 2018 

DreamECO Ecology Project Competition since 2014

LearnENG English Skill Test (association with McMillan English)

Mathology Math and Logic Contest

Golden Feathers

See also

References

External links 
 Official Meridian International School−MIS, Kyiv website—
 Official MIS YouTube Channel
 Official MIS Twitter address
 Official MIS Facebook address
 Official MIS Instagram address

International schools in Ukraine
Schools in Kyiv
International Baccalaureate schools in Ukraine
International high schools
Quality Schools International
Educational institutions established in 2001
2001 establishments in Ukraine